Clinton Randall Dixon is an American politician from Georgia. Dixon is a Republican member of the Georgia State Senate for District 45.

References

Republican Party Georgia (U.S. state) state senators
21st-century American politicians
Living people
1979 births